Virgin Radio Lebanon is part of the Virgin Radio chain launched by Richard Branson which is also part of the Virgin Group, operated in Lebanon by Levant Media Hub SAL. Its official launch was on 15 May 2013.

On September 1, 2019, Virgin Radio Stars Lebanon was launched on FM 89.7, alongside its sister radio station Virgin Radio Lebanon on FM 89.5.

References

External links
Virgin Radio Lebanon and Virgin Radio Stars Lebanon official website

2013 establishments in Lebanon
Radio stations established in 2013
Radio stations in Lebanon
Mass media in Beirut